The 2017 Northern Iowa Panthers football team represented the University of Northern Iowa in the 2017 NCAA Division I FCS football season. The team was coached by Mark Farley in his 17th season and played their home games in the UNI-Dome in Cedar Falls, Iowa as members of the Missouri Valley Football Conference. They finished the season 8–5, 6–2 in MVFC play to finish in a tie for second place. The Panthers received an at-large bid to the FCS Playoffs where they defeated Monmouth in the first round before losing in the second round to South Dakota State.

Previous season 
The Panthers finished the 2016 season 5–6, 4–4 in MVFC play to finish in a tie for fourth place.

Coaching staff
David Braun (American football)

Schedule

 Source: Schedule

Ranking movements

Panthers drafted

References

Northern Iowa
Northern Iowa Panthers football seasons
Northern Iowa
Northern Iowa Panthers football